Hoseynabad-e Yek (also Romanized as Ḩoseynābād-e Yek; also known as Ḩoseynābād) is a village in Khorramdasht Rural District, in the Central District of Kuhbanan County, Kerman Province, Iran. At the 2006 census, its population was 10, in 5 families.

References 

Populated places in Kuhbanan County